The 1846–47 United States Senate elections were held on various dates in various states. As these U.S. Senate elections were prior to the ratification of the Seventeenth Amendment in 1913, senators were chosen by state legislatures. Senators were elected over a wide range of time throughout 1846 and 1847, and a seat may have been filled months late or remained vacant due to legislative deadlock. In these elections, terms were up for the senators in Class 2.

The Democratic Party gained four seats in the United States Senate.

Results
Senate party division, 30th Congress (1847–1849)

 Majority party: Democratic (34–38)
 Minority party: Whig (20–21)
 Other parties: Independent Democratic (1)
 Total seats: 58–60

Change in composition

Before the elections 

After the February 1846 elections in Texas.

As a result of the regular elections

As a result of the regular elections

Race summaries

Special elections during the 29th Congress 
In these special elections, the winners were seated during 1846 or in 1847 before March 4; ordered by election date.

Races leading to the 30th Congress 
In these regular elections, the winners were elected for the term beginning March 4, 1847; ordered by state.

All of the elections involved the Class 2 seats.

Special elections during the 30th Congress 
In this special election, the winner was elected in 1847 after March 4.

Iowa 

Iowa became a state in December 1846, but did not elect its senators until December 1848.

Louisiana 

Alexander Barrow (W) died December 29, 1846.  Pierre Soulé (D) was elected January 21, 1847 just to finish the term. Solomon W. Downs (D) was elected to the next term.

New Hampshire 
Democratic appointee Benning W. Jenness lost the June 13, 1846 election to finish the term and the election the same day to the next term.  Joseph Cilley (Liberty) was elected to finish the term, but lost the election to the next term.  John P. Hale was (Independent Democratic) was elected to the next term and would later become a Free Soiler.

Virginia 

William S. Archer (W) lost re-election to Democrat Robert M. T. Hunter.

Virginia (special) 

Isaac S. Pennybacker (D), who was not up for election, died January 12, 1847. James Murray Mason (D) was elected January 21, 1847.

See also
 1846 United States elections
 1846–47 United States House of Representatives elections
 29th United States Congress
 30th United States Congress

References

 Party Division in the Senate, 1789-Present, via Senate.gov